Álvaro Aparicio Fernández (born 29 September 1977), commonly known as Álvaro, is a Spanish futsal player who plays for Inter Movistar as an Ala.

Honours
1 runner FIFA Futsal World Cup (2008)
4 Leagues (05/06, 06/07, 08/09, 09/10)
2 Copa de España (2008, 2010)
4 Supercopas de España (2000, 2006, 2010, 2011)
2 UEFA Futsal Championship (2007, 2010)
1 Cup Winners Cup (2003)
1 Copa Ibérica (2007)
1 FIFA Singapur Tournament(2001)
1 Intercontinental (2000)

External links
LNFS profile
RFEF profile
UEFA profile

1977 births
Living people
Sportspeople from Madrid
Spanish men's futsal players
Caja Segovia FS players
ElPozo Murcia FS players
Inter FS players